Jarujin's forest gecko (Cyrtodactylus jarujini) is a species of lizard in the family Gekkonidae. The species is endemic to Southeast Asia.

Etymology
The specific name, jarujini, is in honor of Thai herpetologist Jarujin Nabhitabhata (1950–2008).

Geographic range
C. jarujini is found in Laos and northern Thailand.

Habitat
The preferred natural habitat of C. jarujini is forest.

Reproduction
C. jarujini is oviparous.

References

Further reading
Chan-ard T, Parr JWK, Nabhitabhata J (2015). A Field Guide to the Reptiles of Thailand. New York: Oxford University Press. 352 pp.  (hardcover),  (paperback).
Rösler H (2000). "Kommentierte Liste der rezent, subrezent und fossil bekannten Geckotaxa (Reptilia: Gekkonomorpha)". Gekkota 2: 28–153. (Cyrtodactylus jarujini, p. 66). (in German).
Rösler H, Glaw F (2008). "A new species of Cyrtodactylus Gray, 1827 (Squamata: Gekkonidae) from Malaysia including a literature survey of mensural and meristic data in the genus". Zootaxa 1729: 8–22.
Ulber T (1993). "Bemerkungen über cyrtodactyline Geckos aus Thailand nebst Beschreibungen von zwei neuen Arten (Reptilia: Gekkonidae) ". Mitteilungen aus dem Zoologischen Museum in Berlin 69 (2): 187-200. (Cyrtodactylus jarujini, new species). (in German).

Cyrtodactylus
Reptiles described in 1993